Ernie Reyes may refer to:

Ernie Reyes Jr. (born 1972), American actor and martial artist
Ernie Reyes Sr., American martial artist, actor and fight choreographer